Below is the list of populated places in Muğla Province, Turkey by the districts. In the following lists first place in each list is the administrative center of the district.

Muğla

	Muğla
	Akçaova, Muğla
	Akkaya, Muğla
	Akyer, Muğla
	Algı, Muğla
	Avcılar, Muğla
	Bağyaka, Muğla
	Bayır, Muğla
	Bozyer, Muğla
	Çakmak, Muğla
	Çamoluk, Muğla
	Çaybükü, Muğla
	Çırpı, Muğla
	Çiftlik, Muğla
	Dağdibi, Muğla
	Dağpınar, Muğla
	Denizova, Muğla
	Derinkuyu, Muğla
	Doğan, Muğla
	Dokuzçam, Muğla
	Esençay, Muğla
	Fadıl, Muğla
	Gazeller, Muğla
	Göktepe, Muğla
	Gülağzı, Muğla
	Günlüce, Muğla
	İkizce, Muğla
	Kafaca, Muğla
	Karacaören, Muğla
	Kıran, Muğla
	Kozağaç, Muğla
	Kuyucak, Muğla
	Kuzluk, Muğla
	Meke, Muğla
	Muratlar, Muğla
	Ortaköy, Muğla
	Özlüce, Muğla
	Paşapınarı, Muğla
	Salihpaşalar, Muğla
	Sarnıç, Muğla
	Sungur, Muğla
	Şenyayla, Muğla
	Taşlı, Muğla
	Yaraş, Muğla
	Yemişendere, Muğla
	Yenibağyaka, Muğla
	Yenice, Muğla
	Yeniköy, Muğla
	Yeniköy, Muğla
	Yerkesik, Muğla
	Yeşilyurt, Muğla
	Yörükoğlu, Muğla
	Zeytin, Muğla

Bodrum

	Bodrum
	Akyarlar, Bodrum
	Bahçeyaka, Bodrum
	Bitez, Bodrum
	Çamarası, Bodrum
	Çamlık, Bodrum
	Çömlekçi, Bodrum
	Dağbelen, Bodrum
	Dereköy, Bodrum
	Gökpınar, Bodrum
	Göltürkbükü, Bodrum
	Gümüşlük, Bodrum
	Gündoğan, Bodrum
	Gürece, Bodrum
	Güvercinlik, Bodrum
	İslamhaneleri, Bodrum
	Kemer, Bodrum
	Konacık, Bodrum
	Kumköy, Bodrum
	Mazıköy, Bodrum
	Mumcular, Bodrum
	Ortakentyahşi, Bodrum
	Peksimet, Bodrum
	Pınarlıbelen, Bodrum
	Sazköy, Bodrum
	Tepecik, Bodrum
	Turgutreis, Bodrum
	Yakaköy, Bodrum
	Yalı, Bodrum
	Yalıkavak, Bodrum
	Yeniköy, Bodrum

Dalaman

	Dalaman
	Bozbel, Dalaman
	Çöğmen, Dalaman
	Darıyeri, Dalaman
	Elcik, Dalaman
	Gürköy, Dalaman
	Gürleyk, Dalaman
	Kapukargın, Dalaman
	Karacaağaç, Dalaman
	Kargınkürü, Dalaman
	Kavacık, Dalaman
	Kayadibi, Dalaman
	Kızılkaya, Dalaman
	Narlı, Dalaman
	Sabunlu, Dalaman
	Şerefler, Dalaman
	Taşbaşı, Dalaman

Datça

	Datça
	Cumalı, Datça 
	Emecik, Datça 
	Hızırşah, Datça 
	Karaköy, Datça 
	Kızlan, Datça 
	Mesudiye, Datça 
	Sındı, Datça 
	Yaka, Datça 
	Yazı, Datça

Fethiye

       Fethiye	
	Alaçat, Fethiye
	Arifler, Fethiye
	Arpacık, Fethiye
	Arsaköy, Fethiye
	Atlıdere, Fethiye
	Bağlıağaç, Fethiye
	Bayırköy, Fethiye
	Bekçiler, Fethiye
	Boğalar, Fethiye
	Boğaziçi, Fethiye
	Bozyer, Fethiye
	Ceylan, Fethiye
	Çaltılar, Fethiye
	Çaltıözü, Fethiye
	Çamköy, Fethiye
	Çamurköy, Fethiye
	Çatak, Fethiye
	Çayan, Fethiye
	Çaykenarı, Fethiye
	Çenger, Fethiye
	Çiftlik, Fethiye
	Çobanisa, Fethiye
	Çobanlar, Fethiye
	Çökek, Fethiye
	Çukurincir, Fethiye
	Demirler, Fethiye
	Dereköy, Fethiye
	Dodurga, Fethiye
	Doğanlar, Fethiye
	Döğer, Fethiye
	Eldirek, Fethiye
	Esenköy, Fethiye
	Eşen, Fethiye
	Fethiye, Fethiye
	Girmeler, Fethiye
	Göcek, Fethiye
	Gökben, Fethiye
	Gökçeovacık, Fethiye
	Gölbent, Fethiye
	Güneşli, Fethiye
	Hacıosmanlar, Fethiye
	İncirköy, Fethiye
	İnlice, Fethiye
	İzzettinköy, Fethiye
	Kabaağaç, Fethiye
	Kadıköy, Fethiye
	Karaağaç, Fethiye
	Karacaören, Fethiye
	Karaçulha, Fethiye
	Karadere, Fethiye
	Karaköy, Fethiye
	Kargı, Fethiye
	Kayabaşı, Fethiye
	Kayacık, Fethiye
	Kayadibi, Fethiye
	Kayaköy, Fethiye
	Keçiler, Fethiye
	Kemer, Fethiye
	Kıncılar, Fethiye
	Kınık, Fethiye
	Kızılbel, Fethiye
	Korubükü, Fethiye
	Koruköy, Fethiye
	Kumluova, Fethiye
	Minare, Fethiye
	Ortaköy, Fethiye
	Ölüdeniz, Fethiye
	Ören, Fethiye
	Paşalı, Fethiye
	Sahilceylan, Fethiye
	Sarıyer, Fethiye
	Seki, Fethiye
	Seydiler, Fethiye
	Söğütlü, Fethiye
	Söğütlüdere, Fethiye
	Temel, Fethiye
	Uğurlu, Fethiye
	Uzunyurt, Fethiye
	Yakabağ, Fethiye
	Yakacık, Fethiye
	Yakaköy, Fethiye
	Yanıklar, Fethiye
	Yaylapatlangıç, Fethiye
	Yeşilüzümlü, Fethiye
	Zorlar, Fethiye

Kavaklıdere

	Kavaklıdere
	Çamlıbel, Kavaklıdere
	Çamlıyurt, Kavaklıdere
	Çavdır, Kavaklıdere
	Çayboyu, Kavaklıdere
	Derebağ, Kavaklıdere
	Kurucuova, Kavaklıdere
	Menteşe, Kavaklıdere
	Nebiler, Kavaklıdere
	Ortaköy, Kavaklıdere
	Salkım, Kavaklıdere
	Yeşilköy, Kavaklıdere

Köyceğiz

	Köyceğiz
	Akköprü, Köyceğiz
	Balcılar, Köyceğiz
	Beyobası, Köyceğiz
	Çandır, Köyceğiz
	Çayhisar, Köyceğiz
	Döğüşbelen, Köyceğiz
	Ekincik, Köyceğiz
	Hamitköy, Köyceğiz
	Karaçam, Köyceğiz
	Kavakarası, Köyceğiz
	Köyceğiz, Köyceğiz
	Otmanlar, Köyceğiz
	Pınar, Köyceğiz
	Sazak, Köyceğiz
	Sultaniye, Köyceğiz
	Toparlar, Köyceğiz
	Yangı, Köyceğiz
	Yayla, Köyceğiz
	Yeşilköy, Köyceğiz
	Zaferler, Köyceğiz
	Zeytinalanı, Köyceğiz

Marmaris

	Marmaris
	Adaköy, Marmaris
	Armutalan, Marmaris
	Bayır, Marmaris
	Beldibi, Marmaris
	Bozburun, Marmaris
	Çamlı, Marmaris
	Çetibeli, Marmaris
	Hisarönü, Marmaris
	İçmeler, Marmaris
	Karaca, Marmaris
	Orhaniye, Marmaris
	Osmaniye, Marmaris
	Selimiye, Marmaris
	Söğüt, Marmaris
	Taşlıca, Marmaris
	Turgut, Marmaris
	Turunç, Marmaris
	Yeşilbelde, Marmaris

Milas

	Milas	
	Ağaçlıhüyük, Milas	
	Akçakaya, Milas	
	Akçalı, Milas	
	Akkovanlık, Milas	
	Akyol, Milas	
	Alaçam, Milas	
	Alatepe, Milas	
	Aslanyaka, Milas	
	Avşar, Milas	
	Bafa, Milas	
	Bağdamları, Milas	
	Baharlı, Milas	
	Bahçe, Milas	
	Bahçeburun, Milas	
	Balcılar, Milas	
	Bayır, Milas	
	Beçin, Milas	
	Beyciler, Milas	
	Boğaziçi, Milas	
	Bozalan, Milas	
	Bozbük, Milas	
	Çakıralan, Milas	
	Çallı, Milas	
	Çamköy, Milas	
	Çamlıbelen, Milas	
	Çamlıca, Milas	
	Çamlıyurt, Milas	
	Çamovalı, Milas	
	Çandır, Milas	
	Çınarlı, Milas	
	Çiftlik, Milas	
	Çomakdağkızılağaç, Milas	
	Çökertme, Milas	
	Çukur, Milas	
	Damlıboğaz, Milas	
	Danişment, Milas	
	Demirciler, Milas	
	Dere, Milas	
	Derince, Milas	
	Dibekdere, Milas	
	Dörttepe, Milas	
	Eğridere, Milas	
	Ekinanbarı, Milas	
	Ekindere, Milas	
	Ekizköy, Milas	
	Ekiztaş, Milas	
	Epçe, Milas	
	Etrenli, Milas	
	Fesleğen, Milas	
	Gökbel, Milas	
	Gökçeler, Milas	
	Göldere, Milas	
	Gölyaka, Milas	
	Güllük, Milas	
	Günlük, Milas	
	Gürceğiz, Milas	
	Gürçamlar, Milas	
	Hacıahmetler, Milas	
	Hasanlar, Milas	
	Hisarcık, Milas	
	Hüsamlar, Milas	
	İçme, Milas	
	Kafaca, Milas	
	Kalem, Milas	
	Kalınağıl, Milas	
	Kandak, Milas	
	Kapıkırı, Milas	
	Karacaağaç, Milas	
	Karacahisar, Milas	
	Karahayıt, Milas	
	Karakuyu, Milas	
	Karapınar, Milas	
	Kargıcak, Milas	
	Karşıyaka, Milas	
	Kayabaşı, Milas	
	Kayabükü, Milas	
	Kayadere, Milas	
	Kazıklı, Milas	
	Kemikler, Milas	
	Ketendere, Milas	
	Kılavuz, Milas	
	Kırcağız, Milas	
	Kısırlar, Milas	
	Kıyıkışlacık, Milas	
	Kızılağaç, Milas	
	Kızılcakuyu, Milas	
	Kızılcayıkık, Milas	
	Konak, Milas	
	Koru, Milas	
	Korucuk, Milas	
	Köşk, Milas	
	Kultak, Milas	
	Kurudere, Milas	
	Kuzyaka, Milas	
	Küçükdibekdere, Milas	
	Menteş, Milas	
	Meşelik, Milas	
	Narhisar, Milas	
	Olukbaşı, Milas	
	Ortaköy, Milas	
	Ovakışlacık, Milas	
	Ören, Milas	
	Pınararası, Milas	
	Pınarcık, Milas	
	Pinar, Milas	
	Sakarkaya, Milas	
	Sarıkaya, Milas	
	Savran, Milas	
	Sek, Milas	
	Selimiye, Milas	
	Söğütçük, Milas	
	Şenköy, Milas	
	Tuzabat, Milas	
	Türkevleri, Milas	
	Ulaş, Milas	
	Yaka, Milas	
	Yaşyer, Milas	
	Yoğunoluk, Milas	
	Yusufca, Milas

Ortaca

	Ortaca	
	Akıncı, Ortaca	
	Dalyan, Ortaca	
	Dereköy, Ortaca	
	Eskiköy, Ortaca	
	Fevziye, Ortaca	
	Gökbel, Ortaca	
	Gölbaşı, Ortaca	
	Güzelyurt, Ortaca	
	Karadonlar, Ortaca	
	Kemaliye, Ortaca	
	Mergenli, Ortaca	
	Okçular, Ortaca	
	Sarıgerme, Ortaca	
	Tepearası, Ortaca	
	Yeşilyurt, Ortaca

Ula

	Ula	
	Akçapınar, Ula	
	Akyaka, Ula	
	Arıcılar, Ula	
	Armutcuk, Ula	
	Ataköy, Ula	
	Çıtlık, Ula	
	Çiçekli, Ula	
	Çörüş, Ula	
	Elmalı, Ula	
	Esentepe, Ula	
	Gökçe, Ula	
	Gökova, Ula	
	Gölcük, Ula	
	Karabörtlen, Ula	
	Kavakçalı, Ula	
	Kıra, Ula	
	Kızılağaç, Ula	
	Kızılyaka, Ula	
	Örnekköy, Ula	
	Portakallık, Ula	
	Sarayyanı, Ula	
	Şirinköy, Ula	
	Turgut, Ula	
	Yaylasöğüt, Ula	
	Yeşilçam, Ula	
	Yeşilova, Ula

Yatağan

	Yatağan		
	Akgedik, Yatağan		
	Alaşar, Yatağan		
	Bağyaka, Yatağan		
	Bahçeyaka, Yatağan		
	Bencik, Yatağan		
	Bozarmut, Yatağan		
	Bozüyük, Yatağan		
	Cazkırlar, Yatağan		
	Çakırlar, Yatağan		
	Çamlıca, Yatağan		
	Çukuröz, Yatağan		
	Deştin, Yatağan		
	Doğanköy, Yatağan		
	Elmacık, Yatağan		
	Esenköy, Yatağan		
	Eskihisar, Yatağan		
	Gökgedik, Yatağan		
	Gökpınar, Yatağan		
	Hacıbayramlar, Yatağan		
	Hacıveliler, Yatağan		
	Hisarardı, Yatağan		
	Kadıköy, Yatağan		
	Kafacakaplancık, Yatağan		
	Kapubağ, Yatağan		
	Katrancı, Yatağan		
	Kavakköy, Yatağan		
	Kırıkköy, Yatağan		
	Kozağaç, Yatağan		
	Köklük, Yatağan		
	Madenler, Yatağan		
	Mesken, Yatağan		
	Nebiköy, Yatağan		
	Şahinler, Yatağan		
	Şerefköy, Yatağan		
	Turgut, Yatağan		
	Turgutlar, Yatağan		
	Yava, Yatağan		
	Yayla, Yatağan		
	Yenikarakuyu, Yatağan		
	Yeniköy, Yatağan		
	Yeşilbağcılar, Yatağan		
	Yeşilköy, Yatağan		
	Yukarıyayla, Yatağan		
	Zeytin, Yatağan

Recent development

According to Law act no 6360, all Turkish provinces with a population more than 750 000, were renamed as metropolitan municipality. Furthermore, a new district was established; Seydikemer. All districts in those provinces became second level municipalities and all villages in those districts  were renamed as a neighborhoods . Thus the villages listed above are officially neighborhoods of Muğla.

References

Mugla
List